State Route 89 (SR 89) is a  state highway in the U.S. state of Arizona. It is part of the former route of U.S. Route 89 (US 89) throughout the state.

Route description
The southern terminus of SR 89 is located at an intersection with U.S. Route 93 northwest of Wickenburg. It is a largely south-north route; the largest city through which it now passes is Prescott, where it meets SR 69 and the extremely scenic SR 89A. The segment between Prescott and Congress (intersection with SR 71) is quite scenic. The northern terminus of the highway is located at an interchange with Interstate 40 (I-40) in Ash Fork.

History

This highway was a segment of US 89 between Ash Fork at I-40 and US 93 northwest of Wickenburg.

All of US 89 was deleted south of its current southern terminus with Interstate 40 in Flagstaff after interstate highways offered shorter and more direct routes than the old long-distance US 89 in central and southern Arizona in 1993.

Junction list

See also
Drake, Arizona, site of the old Hell Canyon Bridge formerly used by US 89, now on the National Register of Historic Places.

References

External links

089
Arizona State Route 089
Transportation in Yavapai County, Arizona
Prescott, Arizona